is a multiplayer beat 'em up game developed and published by Namco in 2005 exclusively for the PlayStation 2.

Plot
Urban Reign follows the exploits of "brawler-for-hire" Brad Hawk, who is hired to find a kidnapped gang member by the swordswoman Shun Ying Lee. Brad fights his way through the street gangs of Green Harbor, a fortified city in the U.S. As he does so to get some answers, the true machinations of the protagonists reveal themselves and things become more complicated.

Gameplay
Urban Reign features both single player and multiplayer action with both multiple AI opponents and human controlled characters on the same screen fighting at the same time. he environment, pick up weapons, throw objects, give instructions to AI partners, and pull off moves on multiple opponents. There are low and high grapples, air grapples, counters and recounters each with its own animations for each character. Although characters have optimal combo strings, most combos start with three presses of the attack button, the third of which will juggle an opponent. grapple, special move, simply continuing the combo or running away to pick up a weapon or reposition.

Neutralizing attacks by opponents is done with a single button press that must be timed to the moment of the attack. Also, if the player presses up or down on the keypad while pressing dodge at the correct time, his character will reverse an attack, if possible. Even when cornered by multiple enemies, it is possible to dodge all oncoming normal attacks.

Finally, "special arts" can be pulled off with a press of two buttons. Special arts cannot be countered, reversed or dodged except by another special move, and they can be buffered. Characters have a "special arts meter" that must be at a certain level for a move to be attempted. The meter is expended

Reception

The game received "mixed" reviews according to video game review aggregator Metacritic.

GamePro criticised the graphics and control system, but praised the number of arcade-style multiplayer modes. GameSpot said "The cheap difficulty and blandness of the story mode make Urban Reign difficult to recommend." IGN said "Urban Reign really could have made use of better tuning to its AI." Eurogamer said "There's nothing in terms of pay-off to compare to the likes of Ninja Gaiden or God of War in the roaming beat-'em-up genre, which, thugs or not, this is up against, and there's nothing in terms of depth or balance to compare to Virtua Fighter 4 or SoulCalibur for one-on-ones." Games revolution summarised it as "Had it been given a little more depth pretty much everywhere, this may have been a sleeper hit.

References

External links

2005 video games
3D beat 'em ups
Cooperative video games
Namco beat 'em ups
PlayStation 2-only games
Organized crime video games
PlayStation 2 games
Video games developed in Japan
Video games with AI-versus-AI modes
Video games scored by Junichi Nakatsuru
Video games set in the United States